Pieter de Bloot (1601 – c. 6 November 1658) was a Dutch painter.

De Bloot, who was born and died in Rotterdam, primarily painted landscapes and genre works, especially of countryside views and peasant subjects. He also periodically painted religious subjects. Between 1624 and 1630 de Bloot was married three times, since his first two wives died only a few months after the wedding. De Bloot died in 1658.

References

 Bloot, Pieter de at the Netherlands Institute for Art History.

1601 births
1658 deaths
Dutch Golden Age painters
Dutch male painters
Painters from Rotterdam